Cupania is a plant genus in the family Sapindaceae.

Selected species
 
 Cupania alternifolia
 Cupania americana
 Cupania cinerea
 Cupania glabra
 Cupania guatemalensis
 Cupania vernalis

 horticultural names
 Cupania elegans L.Linden., 1893

References

External links 

 
Sapindaceae genera